Pinus luchuensis, commonly called Luchu pine or Okinawa pine, is a species of conifer in the family Pinaceae endemic to, and locally abundant in the Ryukyu Islands of Japan. It was once threatened by habitat loss in the wild, where it can be found growing in small stands near windy ocean shores.  Having been harvested widely since the Second World War, the remaining stands are no longer commercially viable, except when cultivated for ornamental use.

References

luchuensis
Endemic flora of Japan
Flora of the Ryukyu Islands
Trees of Japan
Plants described in 1894
Taxonomy articles created by Polbot